Montgomery Meigs may refer to:

People
Montgomery C. Meigs (1816–1892), Quartermaster General of the U.S. Army during the American Civil War
Montgomery C. Meigs, Jr. (1847-1931), civil engineer
Montgomery Cunningham Meigs (1919–1944), World War II lieutenant colonel tank commander, father of Montgomery Meigs (1945–2021)
Montgomery Meigs (1945–2021), U.S. Army general who served in Vietnam War, the Gulf War, and Bosnian War

Ships
 USAT Meigs, a U.S. Army transport ship sunk early in World War II
 USS General M. C. Meigs, a U.S. Navy transport ship in World War II

See also
Montgomery Meigs Taylor (1869–1952), admiral during the Spanish–American War, grandson of the Civil War leader
Montgomery Meigs Atwater (1904–1976), avalanche researcher, grandson of the civil engineer